Cuncapata (possibly from Aymara kunka throat, pata step, Quechua kunka throat, pata elevated place / above, at the top / edge, bank (of a river), shore,) is a mountain in the Vilcanota mountain range in the Andes of Peru, about  high. It is located in the Cusco Region, Canchis Province, Pitumarca District. Cuncapata lies southwest of the mountain Jatunñaño Punta, north of the lake Sibinacocha and southeast of Chumpe.

References

Mountains of Cusco Region
Mountains of Peru